Tam Mutu (born April 30, 1978) is an English stage and screen actor. He began his career on the West End in the early 2000s. He was part of the original West End production of Andrew Lloyd Webber's Love Never Dies (2010–2011) before starring in the revivals of Les Misérables (2013–2014) and City of Angels (2015). That same year he starred in the original Broadway musical Doctor Zhivago. He returned to Broadway in 2019 with Moulin Rouge! The Musical; for his supporting role of the Duke of Monroth he was nominated for a Grammy Award. On screen, he had a recurring role on the Netflix show Medici.

Life and career 
Mutu was born in 1978 in Hastings, England. He has one sister and played football growing up before pursuing acting. He attended the Guildford School of Acting, graduating in 2001 with a Bachelors of Arts with honors in musical theatre. He is of Turkish and Italian descent.

2001–2015: West End and British theatre 
Following his graduation from drama school in 2001, he was cast as a replacement ensemble member and understudy for Enjolras in the long-running West End production of Les Misérables. In the following five years, he took part in a number of productions with the Royal National Theatre and Royal Shakespeare Company. He also took part in the Regent's Park Open Air Theatre 2002 theatre season.

In 2010, he was part of the original ensemble of the Andrew Lloyd Webber Phantom of the Opera sequel Love Never Dies. Originally the understudy for Ramin Karimloo's Phantom, he later became the alternate. Following its closure, Mutu went on to star in a Toronto production of Chess.

In 2011, Mutu was cast to co-star in the ill-fated gothic musical Rebecca. Set to be his Broadway debut, the production was ultimately cancelled. A few days following the initial postponement of Rebecca in 2012, he was cast to replace Javert in the West End production of Les Misérables. During his time with the show in 2013–2014, the production was a fan favorite, winning the 2014 Olivier Audience Award with Mutu also awarded for his performance by BroadwayWorld and the West End Frame Awards. He went on to star in the Olivier Award-winning revival of City of Angels which opened at Donmar Warehouse in December 2014.

2015–present: Broadway and American theatre 
Mutu moved to the United States in 2015 to star in the original Broadway musical Doctor Zhivago. The production was ultimately short-lived and closed after a month. He starred as Carey Grant in the initial 2015 and 2016 readings of Flying Over Sunset. He took part in the Encores! concert series and regional theatre, and in 2017 filmed the second season of the Netflix series Medici in Italy.

He was cast as the antagonist, the Duke of Monroth, in the pre-Broadway engagement of Moulin Rouge! The Musical in 2018. The production transferred to Broadway and opened in July 2019. The production was paused in March 2020; at that time, Mutu contracted COVID-19 and was hospitalized. The production resumed in September 2021. In May 2022, Mutu departed the production with other original cast members Aaron Tveit and Ricky Rojas.

Personal life 
Mutu is noted for his baritone voice. He is married to Kristen "Kem" Martin, a fellow Broadway actor. Mutu was previously engaged to actress Sierra Boggess, his whom he performed with in Love Never Dies and Rebecca.

Acting credits

Television

Theatre 
Selected credits

Awards and nominations

References

External links 

 
 Tam Mutu on the Internet Broadway Database
 Tam Mutu on About the Artists

English actors
1978 births
Living people
English musical theatre actors
People from Hastings
English people of Turkish descent
English people of Italian descent